Bowie is a genus of Ctenidae that was described by Peter Jäger in 2022. The genus was named after the English singer-songwriter and actor David Bowie and currently encompasses 107 species, 55 of which were named after elements from David Bowie's musical catalogue.

Species
, the genus contains 107 species that occur from the Himalayas to Papua New Guinea and northern Australia:

Bowie abdulmajid Jäger, 2022 – Singapore
Bowie afterall Jäger, 2022 – Sri Lanka
Bowie aladdinsane Jäger, 2022 – India
Bowie andamanensis (Graveley, 1931) – India (Andaman Is.)
Bowie angigitanus (Roewer, 1938) – Papua New Guinea
Bowie angularis (Roewer, 1938) – Indonesia (Aru Is.)
Bowie argentipes (van Hasselt, 1893) – Malaysia (Peninsula), Singapore, Indonesia (Sumatra)
Bowie artdecade Jäger, 2022 – Cambodia
Bowie aruanus (Strand, 1911) – Indonesia (Aru Is.)
Bowie ashestoashes Jäger, 2022 – Indonesia (Borneo)
Bowie banna (Yao & Li, 2022) – China
Bowie bantaengi (Merian, 1911) – Indonesia (Sulawesi)
Bowie bayeri (Jäger, 2012) – Laos
Bowie bemywife Jäger, 2022 – Thailand
Bowie bicostatus (Thorell, 1890) –  Malaysia (Borneo)
Bowie bigbrother Jäger, 2022 – Vietnam 
Bowie blackout Jäger, 2022 – Malaysia (Peninsula)
Bowie blackstar Jäger, 2022 – Papua New Guinea
Bowie bluejean Jäger, 2022 – Malaysia (Borneo)
Bowie bomdilaensis (Tikader & Malhotra, 1981) – India
Bowie bowonglangi (Merian, 1911) – Indonesia (Sulawesi)
Bowie candidate Jäger, 2022 – Vietnam
Bowie catpeople Jäger, 2022 – Malaysia (Borneo)
Bowie celebensis (Pocock, 1897) – Indonesia (Sulawesi)
Bowie ceylonensis (F. O. P-Cambridge, 1897) – Sri Lanka
Bowie chinagirl Jäger, 2022 – Malaysia (Borneo)
Bowie cladarus (Jäger, 2012) – Myanmar
Bowie cochinensis (Gravely, 1931) – India
Bowie corniger (F. O. Pickard-Cambridge, 1898) – South Africa (introduced?)
Bowie criminalworld Jäger, 2022 – Malaysia (Borneo)
Bowie crystaljapan Jäger, 2022 – Indonesia (Sumatra)
Bowie diamonddogs Jäger, 2022 – Vietnam
Bowie dodo Jäger, 2022 – Vietnam
Bowie fame Jäger, 2022 – Vietnam
Bowie fascination Jäger, 2022 – Vietnam
Bowie fashion Jäger, 2022 – Malaysia (Peninsula)
Bowie floweri (F. O. Pickard-Cambridge, 1897) – Malaysia (Peninsula)
Bowie fungifer (Thorell, 1890) – Malaysia (Peninsula)
Bowie goaensis (Bastawade & Borkar, 2008) – India
Bowie haiphong Yao & Li, 2022 – Vietnam
Bowie heroes Jäger, 2022 – India
Bowie himalayensis (Gravely, 1931) – India
Bowie holthoffi (Jäger, 2012) – Laos
Bowie hosei (F. O. Pickard-Cambridge, 1897) – Borneo (Malaysia, Brunei)
Bowie hunkydory Jäger, 2022 – Nepal
Bowie indicus (Gravely, 1931) – India
Bowie javanus (Pocock, 1897) – Indonesia (Sumatra, Java, Bali)
Bowie jeangenie Jäger, 2022 – India
Bowie joethelion Jäger, 2022 – Malaysia (Peninsula)
Bowie kapuri (Tikader, 1973) – India (Andaman Is.)
Bowie kochi (Simon, 1897) – Indonesia (New Guinea)
Bowie ladystardust Jäger, 2022 – Nepal
Bowie lazarus Jäger, 2022 – Papua New Guinea
Bowie letsdance Jäger, 2022 – Indonesia (Java)
Bowie lishuqiang (Jäger, 2012) – China
Bowie lodger Jäger, 2022 – Philippines
Bowie low Jäger, 2022 – Thailand
Bowie magicdance Jäger, 2022 – Indonesia (Sulawesi)
Bowie majortom Jäger, 2022 – Nepal
Bowie martensi (Jäger, 2012) – Nepal
Bowie meghalayaensis (Tikader, 1976) – India
Bowie mengla Yao & Li, 2022 – China
Bowie modernlove Jäger, 2022 – Malaysia (Borneo)
Bowie monaghani (Jäger, 2013) – Laos
Bowie mossgarden Jäger, 2022 – Malaysia (Peninsula)
Bowie narashinhai (Patel & Reddy, 1988) – India
Bowie natmataung (Jäger & Minn, 2015) – Myanmar
Bowie neukoeln Jäger, 2022 – Malaysia (Peninsula)
Bowie palembangensis (Strand, 1906) – Indonesia (Sumatra)
Bowie philippinensis (F. O. Pickard-Cambridge, 1897) – Philippines
Bowie pingu (Jäger & Minn, 2015) – Myanmar
Bowie pulvinatus (Thorell, 1890) – Malaysia (Borneo)
Bowie ramosus (Thorell, 1887) – Myanmar
Bowie rebelrebel Jäger, 2022 – Vietnam
Bowie redsails Jäger, 2022 – Philippines
Bowie ricochet Jäger, 2022 – Indonesia (Borneo)
Bowie right Jäger, 2022 – Vietnam
Bowie robustus (Thorell, 1897) – Myanmar, Thailand, Laos, China
Bowie rufisternis (Pocock, 1898) – Papua New Guinea (New Britain)
Bowie saci (Ono, 2010) – Vietnam
Bowie sagittatus (Giltay, 1935) – Indonesia (Sulawesi)
Bowie sarawakensis (F. O. Pickard-Cambridge, 1897) – Borneo (Malaysia, Brunei)
Bowie scarymonsters Jäger, 2022 – Indonesia (Sumatra)
Bowie shakeit Jäger, 2022 – Malaysia (Borneo)
Bowie sikkimensis (Gravely, 1931) – India
Bowie simplex (Thorell, 1897) – Myanmar, Thailand, Laos
Bowie stationtostation Jäger, 2022 – Myanmar
Bowie stay Jäger, 2022 – Vietnam
Bowie subterraneans Jäger, 2022 – Thailand
Bowie teenagewildlife Jäger, 2022 – Indonesia (Sumatra)
Bowie thenextday Jäger, 2022 – Indonesia (New Guinea)
Bowie theodorianum (Jäger, 2012) – Thailand, Laos, Vietnam
Bowie thiesi Jäger, 2022 – Papua New Guinea
Bowie thorelli (F. O. Pickard-Cambridge, 1897) – Sri Lanka
Bowie tonight Jäger, 2022 – Malaysia (Borneo)
Bowie underground Jäger, 2022 – Malaysia (Borneo)
Bowie valvularis (van Hasselt, 1882) – Indonesia (Java, Sumatra)
Bowie warszawa Jäger, 2022 – Thailand
Bowie win Jäger, 2022 – Vietnam
Bowie withinyou Jäger, 2022 – Malaysia (Borneo)
Bowie withoutyou Jäger, 2022 – Malaysia (Borneo)
Bowie yaeyamensis (Yoshida, 1998) – Japan (Ryukyu Is.), Taiwan
Bowie yassassin Jäger, 2022 – Taiwan
Bowie youngamericans Jäger, 2022 – Vietnam
Bowie yulin (Yao & Li, 2022) – China
Bowie zhengi Yao & Li, 2022 – China
Bowie ziggystardust Jäger, 2022 – Nepal

See also
 List of organisms named after famous people (born 1900–1949)

References

Araneomorphae genera
Ctenidae